Gert Wünsche (born 19 February 1943) is a former German footballer.

Wünsche made 22 appearances for Fortuna Düsseldorf in the Fußball-Bundesliga during his playing career.

External links 
 

1943 births
Living people
German footballers
Association football defenders
Bundesliga players
Fortuna Düsseldorf players